Cecilie Østensen Berglund (born 2 October 1971) is a Norwegian judge.

She graduated with the cand.jur. degree in 1998. Berglund worked for many years in the Supreme Court of Norway, among others as assisting director, before serving as a judge in Borgarting Court of Appeal from 2009. She was appointed as a Supreme Court Justice in 2017.

References

1971 births
Living people
Judges from Oslo
Supreme Court of Norway justices
Norwegian women judges
Civil servants from Oslo